Aphomia foedella is a species of snout moth in the genus Aphomia. It was described by Zeller, in 1839. It is found in the Czech Republic, Slovakia, Hungary, Romania, and Ukraine.

References

External links

lepiforum.de

Moths described in 1839
Tirathabini
Moths of Europe